Me2day was a microblogging and social networking service in South Korea acquired and owned by NHN Corporation (present-day Naver Corporation). Similar to Twitter, Me2day was popular in South Korea with earlier establishments in android market, especially among adolescents and youth of twenties. Me2DAY had an open API and most of the applications built around it added entertainment benefits to the site. OpenID was available until March 2010, but since then until the site's closure at the end of June 2014, registration was required. Information acquired during registration included only email address, ID, and password. It allowed users to send and receive up to 150 characters to each other. Many people like Big Bang, Wonder Girls, 2NE1, F(x), 2PM, Kim Tae-hee, SHINee, U-Kiss and Seoul Samsung Thunders used the service as a way of keeping their fans updated about their whereabouts. Because Me2day was run by the NHN Corporation, the creator of one of the biggest Korean portal websites Naver.com, a Naver ID user could also immediately set up an account for Me2day without signing up.

Features
A user can befriend another by adding him/her as a friend, which will send the person a request according to the account settings; a user can change account settings to enable automatic acceptance of friends or can manually accept friends by clicking accept on their friend request. In addition, a function is provided for uploading a selected day's postings onto a personal blog in Tistory.
 Summon (소환) - Similar to Twitter's "mention," allowed the user to add other users and talk to them.
 Me2 - Similar to Twitter's "retweet", allowed the user to repost another user's message. The term derives from the English expression of agreement, ‘Me, too’.
 Band - Allowed a user to start fan clubs, interest groups, etc.
 me2day had apps available for users of iOS and Android

Site closure
On November 28, 2013, Me2day sent out an email to all users informing them that they will officially be shutting down the service on June 30, 2014.

See also
 Cyworld
 Twitter

References

External links
 

Naver Corporation
Internet properties established in 2007
Internet properties disestablished in 2014
South Korean companies established in 2007
2014 disestablishments in South Korea
Text messaging
South Korean social networking websites
Defunct social networking services